Illas (variant: San Julián) is one of three parishes (administrative divisions) in Illas, a municipality within the province and autonomous community of Asturias, by northern Spain's Picos de Europa mountains.

Villages

Parishes in Illas